Following is the list of insurance companies in India which have been approved by the Insurance Regulatory and Development Authority of India (IRDAI) which is a statutory body regulating and promoting the insurance and reinsurance industries in India.There are three types of Insurance Companies in India which are as given below:

Life insurance companies 
As of September 2022, IRDAI has recognized 24 life insurance companies. Following is the list:

General insurance companies 
As of September 2022, IRDAI has recognized 31 non-life insurance companies.

Reinsurance companies 
As of January 2023, IRDAI has recognized one reinsurance company.

References

External links
 Insurance Regulatory & Development Authority

Life insurance companies of India
India